Alberto A. Guani Amarilla (born April 9, 1959) is a Uruguayan diplomat.

Education
BS - Journalism 'Universidad de la Republica del Uruguay *MBA- International Relations

Career appointments

 Presently Ambassador of Uruguay to India ,
 Director of Institutional Affairs.
 Director of the Diplomatic Academy, Instituto Artigas del Servicio Exterior. Casa Persico, Montevideo, Uruguay.

 Ambassador of Uruguay to the Federal Republic of Germany from 2012 to 2017.
Director General for Cultural Affairs of the Uruguayan Ministry of Foreign Affairs
Deputy.-Director General for Consular Affairs at the Foreign Srvcs.
Consul General of Uruguay in Rio de Janeiro, Brazil. 
Uruguayan Representative to the United Nations in New York. First Committee and Fourth. Elected Vice-President of First Committee

Became the First delegate representing Uruguay for the Peace and Security Council commission. As well as being the country's representative for De-colonization & International Security dealing with Disarmament issues.

Heads Commission to combat Drug Trafficking.
Ceremonial Director of the Ministry of Foreign Affairs of Uruguay.
Consul of District in East Germany GDR, upon the re-unification of Germany with the wall coming down. Guani was moved to Berlin as Chargé D’ affairs to complete post in the united Germany.
Ministry of Foreign Affairs of Uruguay/Entered the career asa Third Secretary. Worked at the Protocol office, cabinet of former Minister Enrique V. iglesias,

General Affair's office and Undersecretary Dept. in the early stages of the diplomatic career.
 Completed all graded courses at the Diplomatic Academy in Uruguay

Professional accomplishments

Directed a reinsertion campaign to introduce Uruguayan products in Eastern European countries. Headed Uruguayan commission to combat drugs. Reactivated the agreements of cooperation to combat drugs between Bolivia, Chile, Colombia and Paraguay. Aided in the insertion of Uruguay's participation in the operations of peace keeping in Georgia, Sierra Leone and the Democratic Republic of Congo.

Elected as vice-president of the First Committee -55 UN General Assembly Session- known as the Millennium Assembly of the UN.
Chief negotiator of the Uruguayan Delegation for the Illicit Arms Convention. Worked on demining campaigns and concluded the Convention regarding the proliferation of arms and small weapons. Active member of the Nonproliferation of Nuclear weapons /Disarmament committee.
 
Deputy-Director of the Artigas Institute for Foreign Services (the Academy for Diplomacy) Re- invigorated the Brazil-Uruguayan Cultural Institute and expanded its reach and services throughout the entire Brazilian Federative Republic. Participated in deepening the interconnections for the power agreements headed by the Uruguayan Secretary of Energy Ingeniero Lepra with the Brazilian Eletrobrás as well as the Energy agreements between Uruguayan's ANCAP and Brazil's Petrobrás.
 
Participates in the High Talks of the G-20, which evaluates the renewal of Multilateral Negotiations initiated at the Doha Rounds.Member of the Uruguayan Economic Team headed by Economy and Finance Minister CPA Danilo Astori regarding conversations at the MERCOSUR level.Participated as an active member in the Uruguayan delegation headed by Professor Belela Herrera, at the Conference for the Community of South American Nations. Integrates the Uruguayan Delegation to MERCOSUR talks representing the Uruguayan government which is headed by the President of Uruguay Dr. Tabaré Vazquez, with meetings held in Río de Janeiro.
 
Forms part of the Delegation in the negotiations and creation of the Banco del Sur.Team member for the Working Group at UNASUR which discusses the Mechanism of Solutions for Controversies regarding Investments for the UNASUR members.Designated team representative for the XI -Reunión del Consejo de Delegados de UNASUR, whose objective was the elaboration of the Constitution of the entity.
 
Participates in the conversations for the coordination of the WTO meetings which would enhance the Doha Round. All Foreign Ministers of the MERCOSUR participate at the meeting in Rio de Janeiro on July 14. Team member representing the Uruguayan delegation to the Summit Meeting of Latin America and the Caribbean held in Bahia October 2008. 
 
Represented Uruguay in the Seminar; “Políticas Públicas para Incentivar la Innovación en el sector privado: Una Agenda Prioritaria” – or Public Policies to incentivize the public sector- a priority agenda, sponsored by the Iberoamerican General Secretary and the Dept of Science and Technology of Brazil.Appointed Delegate for the Foreign Service Dept. as representative under UNESCO. Focal Point appointee for the Alliance of Civilizations initiated by the UN General Assembly to enhance multiculturalism amongst nations.
 
Designated Coordinator for the Ministry of External Relations of Uruguay for the Bi-Centennial Celebration committee which unveils the celebrations of the Emancipatory Process started in Uruguay 200 years ago. Represented Uruguay at the III Regional Forum for the Alliance of Civilizations in Rio de Janeiro, Brasil -May 2010.
April 2011-Alliance of Civilizations Doha, Qatar.

From 2012 to 2017 Ambassador to the Federal Republic of Germany reinvigorating relationship in all matters. During his tenure signature of Social Security Treaty for pensions, special agreements on agriculture, green economy, environment, innovation, renewable energies, state of the art links, official visits to and from Uruguay and Germany. Foreign Ministers, Presidents, Ministers from Agriculture, rebooting all aspects among both countries.
 
Honorary President of the Brazil-Uruguay Institute in Río de Janeiro, as well as the Honorary presidency of the Brazilian Uruguayan Chambers of Commerce, part of the Federations of Chambers of Latin America. 
 
Founder of the "Foreign Service Graduate" entity, created at the Universidad de la República Oriental del Uruguay for upcoming foreign service candidates. Author of the publication "Habrá Paz en el Mundo", (Will there be peace in the world) which discusses the thought and need for global or universal disarmament. Author of the publication "Guani el Canciller de América"  (Guani, America's Chancellor) about his grandfather a political figure in Latin America, whose diplomatic efforts and policies were felt throughout the area and beyond.

Conference speaker/presenter

 Speaker at Chandigarh University, India

 Speaker at Meerut University, India
 Speaker at Odisha University, India
 Presenter at New Delhi, University, India

Presenter at the Altos Estudios Nacionales (CALEN), 
Universidad ORT Uruguay 
Uruguayan Army- School for Peace Keeping Operations
Universidad Federal of Río de Janeiro- Institute of Philosophy and Social Sciences 
Foundation Getulio Várgas, Rio de Janeiro
II and III Meetings of the "Latin American Encounters"
Universidad Federal of Rio de Janeiro –on: The Disciplines of Knowledge 
 
Guani also worked as a journalist between 1978 and 1983 at the Diario “El Día” and declined the Directorship of the Official TV SODRE in order to pursue diplomacy.

He speaks Spanish, English, German, French, Italian, Romanian, and Portuguese.

See also
 List of ambassadors of Uruguay

References

External links
List from the Uruguayan Foreign Service Dept
Berlin Global Media Center
El Canciller de America book
Uruguayan Embassy from Germany official site

1959 births
Living people
Ambassadors of Uruguay to Germany